Lilley Run is a  long 2nd order tributary to South Branch French Creek in Erie County, Pennsylvania.

Course
Lilley Run rises in Sparta Township, Crawford County, Pennsylvania, north of Crawford County and then flows north into Erie County through Concord Township where it meets South Branch French Creek.

Watershed
Lilley Run drains  of Erie Drift Plain (glacial geology).  The watershed receives an average of 46.8 in/year of precipitation and has a wetness index of 453.45.

References

Rivers of Pennsylvania
Rivers of Erie County, Pennsylvania
Rivers of Crawford County, Pennsylvania